David Kyp Joel Malone (born February 27, 1973) is an American multi-instrumentalist and member of the bands TV on the Radio, Iran, Rain Machine, and Ice Balloons.

Biography
Malone grew up in Moon Township, Pennsylvania and moved to New Jersey for High School. He graduated from North Hunterdon High School in 1991.

Malone formed the band Iran with film director/singer/songwriter Aaron Aites in 2000.

He later joined Tunde Adebimpe and David Sitek in TV on the Radio  on Desperate Youth, Bloodthirsty Babes and has been in the band ever since. He writes, sings and plays instruments for the band. In his lyrics, he uses poetic imagery to address racism, show business, and politics in an indirect manner.

Malone is in the band Ice Balloons and is also a member of The Yams Collective. He has also worked with Miles Benjamin Anthony Robinson, including producing Robinson's 2009 album Summer Of Fear.

In 2009, he released an album under the name Rain Machine, later touring to support the record. The album was produced by Ian Brennan.
Malone has also toured and played with Jolie Holland, and was an influence and early champion of singer-songwriter Sharon Van Etten.

He has recorded with the Malian band Tinariwen on their 2011 release Tassili. The album was recorded in the Algerian desert near the Libyan border.

Malone was included in the 2002 Bay Area indie film Scumrock. In 2015, Malone made a cameo on the TV series Broad City, playing a music store clerk in the episode "The Matrix".

He provided some of the music for the 2018 documentary film Dreaming of a Vetter World.

He worked in the science fiction film Doors (2021) as Jamal.

References

External links
 

Musicians from Brooklyn
Living people
American multi-instrumentalists
Place of birth missing (living people)
Record producers from New York (state)
American male film actors
African-American rock musicians
1973 births
Guitarists from New Jersey
Guitarists from New York (state)
People from Clinton, New Jersey
North Hunterdon High School alumni
21st-century American guitarists
African-American guitarists
21st-century African-American musicians
20th-century African-American people